The Teddington Lock Footbridges are two footbridges over the River Thames in England, situated just upstream of Teddington Lock at Teddington. There is a small island between the bridges.

The two footbridges were built between 1887 and 1889, funded by donations from local residents and businesses. They replaced a ferry which gave its name to Ferry Road at Teddington. The southern bridge consists of a suspension bridge crossing the weir stream and linking the island to Teddington. The northern bridge is an iron girder bridge crossing the lock cut and linking the island to Ham on the Surrey bank.

In recent years wooden ramps have been added to the approach to the bridge on the Ham side and to the middle part on the small island so that cycles and pushchairs etc. can avoid the steps up to and down from that section of the bridge.

From this point downstream the Thames Path runs on both sides of the river and upstream it runs on the Surrey side only.

The footbridges are both Grade II listed.

See also
Crossings of the River Thames
List of bridges in London
Locks and weirs on the River Thames

References

External links
 Ham Photos blog – photos of Teddington Lock Footbridge with brief descriptions

1887 establishments in England
Bridges completed in 1889
Grade II listed bridges in London
Grade II listed buildings in the London Borough of Richmond upon Thames
Pedestrian bridges across the River Thames
Pedestrian bridges in London
Teddington
Tourist attractions in the London Borough of Richmond upon Thames